Eric Luoma (11 April 1929 – 16 January 2018) was a Canadian cross-country skier who competed in the 1964 Winter Olympics. Luoma was a founding member of the Foothills Nordic Ski Club in Calgary, Alberta (1964).

References

1929 births
2018 deaths
Canadian male cross-country skiers
Olympic cross-country skiers of Canada
Cross-country skiers at the 1964 Winter Olympics